The Television Cultural Center (TVCC) is a 34-story skyscraper on East Third Ring Road, Guanghua Road in the Central Business District (CBD) of Beijing, China. It was due to open in mid-May 2009 containing a hotel, a theater, and several studios. It finally opened on 16 May 2012 due to a major fire.

Planning
The Office for Metropolitan Architecture won the contract from the Beijing International Tendering Co. to construct the CCTV Headquarters and the Television Cultural Center by its side on December 20, 2002. It accommodates visitors and guests, and will be freely accessible to the public. On the ground floor, a continuous lobby provides access to the 1500-seat theater, a large ballroom, digital cinemas, recording studios and exhibition facilities. The cultural complex was designed with the cooperation of dUCKS scéno for the scenography and theater consultancy. and of DHV for the acoustics studies.
The building hosted the international broadcasting center for the 2008 Olympic Games. Nowadays, the tower accommodates a five-star hotel; guests enter at a dedicated drop-off from the east of the building and ascend to the fifth floor housing the check-in as well as restaurants, lounges, and conference rooms. The hotel rooms occupy both sides of the tower, forming a spectacular atrium above the landscape of public facilities.

2009 fire

On February 2, 2009 the TVCC building caught fire due to a fireworks celebration by CCTV during the Lantern Festival, celebrating the New Year. The fire damaged the nearly complete building, delaying its opening until 2012.

See also
 List of tallest buildings in Beijing
Media buildings in Beijing
 China Media Group Headquarters
 Central Radio & TV Tower
 CCTV Headquarters
 Beijing TV Centre
 Phoenix Center

References

External links

CCTV Project Site
Office for Metropolitan Architecture (OMA) Project Site
China Central Television (CCTV) Headquarters Building & Cultural Center, Beijing project for the engineering firm ARUP

China Central Television
Buildings and structures in Chaoyang District, Beijing
Buildings and structures under construction in China
Skyscraper office buildings in Beijing
Skyscraper hotels in Beijing
Postmodern architecture in China
Rem Koolhaas buildings
Ole Scheeren buildings